Women in Scientific and Engineering Professions is a 1984 book co-edited by American authors Violet B. Haas and Carolyn C. Perrucci. It was published through University of Michigan Press. The book was reviewed in several academic journals.

References 

1984 non-fiction books
Women in science and technology
University of Michigan Press books